Fowlie is a surname. Notable people with the surname include:
Brenda Fowlie (born 1953), Canadian journalist and politician
Heather Fowlie (born 1965), Canadian curler
 (1929-1993), American botanist 
Wallace Fowlie (1908–1998), American writer and professor of literature

References